KMGJ (93.1 FM) is a radio station broadcasting a contemporary hit radio format. Licensed to Grand Junction, Colorado, United States, it serves the Grand Junction area.  The station is owned by MBC Grand Broadcasting.

External links

MGJ
Contemporary hit radio stations in the United States
Radio stations established in 1983